Up in Flames may refer to:

 Up in Flames (album), a 2003 album by Dan Snaith, released under the moniker Manitoba
 Up in Flames (film), a 1973 pornographic film
 "Up in Flames" (song), a 2011 song by Coldplay
 "Up in Flames", a 2004 song by Joe Satriani from his album Is There Love in Space?